The Greatest Story Never Told is a 2011 album by rapper Saigon.

The Greatest Story Never Told may also refer to:

 Tuberculosis: The Greatest Story Never Told, a 1992 book by Frank Ryan; see 
 The Greatest Story Never Told, a 2004 album by rapper Shyheim
 "The Greatest Story Never Told" (Justice League Unlimited), a 2004 episode of Justice League Unlimited
 "The Greatest Story Never Told", a song by folk musician John McCutcheon
 "Adolf Hitler: The Greatest Story Never Told", a 2013 movie about Adolf Hitler

See also 
 The Greatest Story Ever Told (disambiguation)